Tirunesh Dibaba (Amharic: ጥሩነሽ ዲባባ ቀነኒ; born 1 June 1985) is an Ethiopian athlete who competed in long-distance track events and international road races. She has won three Olympic track gold medals, five World Championship track gold medals, four individual World Cross Country (WCC) adult titles, and one individual WCC junior title. Tirunesh was the 5000 metres (outdoor track) world record holder until 2020 when Letesenbet Gidey set her world record. She is nicknamed the "Baby Faced Destroyer."

At the 2005 IAAF World Championships in Helsinki, Finland, Tirunesh became the first woman to win the 5000 m and 10000 m at the same championship. She is the one of two women (the other Sonia O'Sullivan) who won the short and long course World Cross Country title at the same championship (2005 in Saint-Galmier, France). With her 2003 World championship title, she became the youngest World Champion at the age of 18 years and 90 days.

Tirunesh comes from a sporting family of several Olympic medalists, which includes her sisters Genzebe and Ejegayehu, and her cousin Derartu Tulu.

Background
Tirunesh was born in the village of Bekoji, Arsi Zone of the Oromia Region and the fourth of six children. She is of Oromo descent. She began competing in athletics at the age of 14. She was raised in the high-altitude Arsi Zone in Oromia, Ethiopia but has lived in Addis Ababa, the capital, since 2000.

Tirunesh comes from an athletic family. Her older sister Ejegayehu won the silver medal in the 10,000 metres at the 2004 Summer Olympics in Athens. As of 25 June 2017, her younger sister Genzebe holds the world record for 1500 metres, 2000 metres and the indoor world records for 1500 metres, one mile (pending ratification), 3000 metres, and 5000 metres. Tirunesh and Genzebe are the only siblings in history to hold concurrent world records. Their cousin Derartu Tulu won gold medals in the 10,000 metres at the 1992 and 2000 Summer Olympics, the bronze medal in the 10,000 metres at the 2004 Summer Olympics, the silver medal in the 10,000 metres at the 1995 World Championships, and the gold medal in the 10,000 metres at the 2001 World Championships.

Career

Junior races

Dibaba's first fully international outdoor event as a junior was the 2001 World Cross Country Championships (WCCC) in Ostend, Belgium where, at the age of 15, she finished fifth.

Dibaba finished second in the junior race at the 2002 WCCC in Dublin, Ireland before winning that race in Lausanne, Switzerland in 2003.

Dibaba also earned a silver medal in the 5000 metres at the 2002 World Junior Championships in Kingston, Jamaica, 1.05 seconds behind Meseret Defar and just 0.05 seconds ahead of bronze medalist Vivian Cheruiyot.

2003: First World Championships gold medal

In May, Dibaba won the only Ethiopian national track championship of her senior career. The event was the 5000 metres, with Meseret Defar finishing second.

In Paris at her World Championships debut, Dibaba won the 5000 metres in a sprint finish against Marta Dominguez of Spain and Edith Masai of Kenya. This made her the youngest athlete to win an individual gold medal at the World Championships. Recalling the race, Dibaba said, "I competed in Paris only because I had the 'A' standard. No one expected me to win. There was no pressure from anywhere. All of them [the pre-race favorites] were looking at each other [during the race] and no one was focusing on the finish line. I just went for it and was surprised that I had won."

In October, she finished fourth in the 5000 metres at the All-Africa Games in Abuja, Nigeria and second in the same event at the Afro-Asian Games in Hyderabad, India. Meseret Defar won both races. Dibaba said, "I was a bit tired after Paris and did not train well. I was not ready to run those races."

2004: Bronze medalist at the Athens Olympics

At the Summer Olympics in Athens, Dibaba finished third in the 5000 metres, behind Meseret Defar and Kenyan Isabella Ochichi. At age 19, she became the youngest-ever medalist for Ethiopia at the Olympics. She said about the race, "I was a bit overweight and after following Elvan [Abeylegesse] at the early part of the race, I just could not follow the rest at the end. I was not disappointed. I had learned my lesson."

2005: Double gold medalist at the World Championships

At the Reebok Boston Indoor Games in January, Dibaba set a world record in the 5000 meters with a finish time of 14:32.93. This was 6.36 seconds faster than the previous world record set by Berhane Adere. Finishing second was Dibaba's sister Ejegayehu, over 25 seconds behind. She faded during the last 1000 metres after running with Tirunesh through 4000 metres in a hand-timed 11:46.2. Tirunesh's 1000 metre splits were 2:56.0 - 2:55.2 - 3:00.0 - 2:55.0 - 2:46.8.

Dibaba won two gold medals in March at the World Cross Country Championships in Saint-Galmier, France. She was the second woman, the other being Sonia O'Sullivan, to win two events since these championships began in 1998.

Dibaba out-sprinted her sister Ejegayehu and Adere to win the 10,000 metres at the World Championships in Helsinki, Finland. One week later, Dibaba broke the championships record while defeating Meseret Defar and sister Ejegayehu to win the 5000 metres and become the first woman to win the 10,000/5000 metres double at the same World Championships. The International Association of Athletics Federations (IAAF) recognized these two victories as the 2005 Female Performances of the Year. Just before these races, Dibaba said, "When I won [the 2003 World Championships] in Paris, everybody called me the 'little girl'. I am no longer that little girl. I have matured and certainly am afraid of no one during competition."

2006: Dibaba-Defar rivalry intensifies

Dibaba won the long race on 1 April at the World Cross Country Championships in Fukuoka, Japan. The next day, however, she was unable to finish the short race.

Dibaba won five of the six Golden League 5000 metre races, which earned her a bonus of US$83,333. She also won the 5000 metres at the World Athletics Final. Dibaba and Meseret Defar raced against each other in five of those seven races, with Dibaba winning four times.

Defar defeated Dibaba in the 5000 metres at the African Championships in Bambous, Mauritius and in the 3000 metres at the World Athletics Final.

2007: Successful defense of 10,000 metres World Championship

Dibaba earned a US$25,000 bonus for breaking her own 5000 metres indoor world record at the Reebok Boston Indoor Games on 27 January, with a finish time  of 14:27.42. Tirunesh's 1000 metre split times were 2:55.28 - 2:53.2 - 2:51.5 - 2:56.68 - 2:46.4.  She held this record until Meseret Defar broke it on 18 February 2009 in Stockholm with a finish time of 14:24.37.

During the 10,000 metres race at the World Championships in Osaka, Dibaba again used her sprint finish to overhaul Turkey's Elvan Abeylegesse, whose second-place finish here was expunged in 2017 for doping. Dibaba won despite having a mid-race tumble and abdominal pains throughout the race. Dibaba's finish time was 31:55.41. She thus became the only woman to win consecutive 10,000 metre titles at the World Championships. She did not compete in the 5000 metres.

2008: Double gold medalist at the Beijing Olympics & 5000 metres world record

At the 6 June Bislett Games in Oslo, a Golden League event, Tirunesh Dibaba set a world record in the 5000 metres, running the distance in 14:11.15. Lucy Wangui Kabuu from Kenya ran a personal best and finished in second place, 22 seconds behind Dibaba. Tirunesh's sister Ejegayehu Dibaba finished in third place with a time of 14:36.78 (4.04 seconds off her personal best). Dibaba bettered Meseret Defar's world record by 5.48 seconds. Tirunesh said after the race, "I've been thinking about this for a long time and this is a very special day for me. I was trying my best, and I knew I was going to break the record with two laps to go. The early part of the race was pretty good, but at 3000 metres we were a little behind, so then I had to catch up on the pace. I could have run faster if the pacing was a little better." Tirunesh's 800 metre split times were: 2:13.7 - 2:19.0 (4:32.7 through 1600 metres) - 2:22.5 (6:55.2 through 2400 metres and 8:03.7 through 2800 metres) - 2:17.8 (9:13.0 through 3200 metres) - 2:15.4 (11:28.4 through 4000 metres)- 2:10.1 (13.38.5 though 4800 metres), with a last 200 metre split of 32.7.

Six days later, Tirunesh defeated her sister Ejegayehu by 0.68 seconds in the 10,000 metres at the Golden Spike Grand Prix in Ostrava, Czech Republic. Tirunesh's finish time was 31:03.37.

Dibaba won the 10,000 metres at the Summer Olympics in Beijing on 15 August. Her finish time of 29:54.66 broke the existing Olympic record of 30:17.49, which had been set by cousin Derartu Tulu at the 2000 Summer Olympics in Sydney. In addition, her finish time was the second fastest 10,000 metres of all time and an African record. The previous African record of 30:04.18 was set by Berhane Adere at the 2003 World Championships.

Seven days later, Dibaba won the 5000 metres, defeating the defending champion Meseret Defar by 2.72 seconds. This made Dibaba the first woman to win both the 5000 and the 10,000 metres at the same Olympic games.

Dibaba was named the 2008 Athlete of the Year by Track & Field News. The IAAF awarded its Female Performance of the Year to Dibaba and Czech javelin thrower Barbora Špotáková. Dibaba was nominated for IAAF World Athlete of the Year, which was won instead by Russian pole vaulter Yelena Isinbayeva for the third time.

2009: World record at 15 kilometres during injury-shortened season

Injuries prevented Dibaba from competing in the World Cross Country Championships in Amman, Jordan and the World Championships in Berlin.

On 15 November, Dibaba won the Zevenheuvelenloop 15 kilometres road race in Nijmegen, Netherlands in a world best time of 46:28. This bettered Kayoko Fukushi's previous world best by almost half a minute. (Dibaba's record was broken by Florence Kiplagat on 15 February 2015.) This was her first competitive road race since 2005, but she downplayed the idea of moving on to road running, stating that the track remained her priority. Her 5 kilometre splits were 15:58 – 15:25 – 15:05. She said, "Although I trained a lot together with my husband for this race, a roadrace is something different. I did not know what I could expect. Therefore, I was not that fast in the beginning. ... After 10 kilometres, I pressed the pace and in the final three kilometres it felt like flying. It feels good as you hear after the finish that your husband also has won."

2010

In February, Dibaba ran the third fastest indoor two-mile race to date (9:12.23) at the Aviva Grand Prix in Birmingham, U.K. Her mile splits were 4:41.2 followed by 4:31.1.

At the World Cross Country Championships in Bydgoszcz, Dibaba finished fourth.

Dibaba successfully defended her 10,000 metres title at the African Championships in Nairobi with a finish time of 31:51.39. Her last 400 metres was timed at 61 seconds.

2012: Successful defense of 10,000 metres Olympic gold medal

A stress fracture in her right leg kept Dibaba out of competition for 16 months. She returned to racing on 31 December 2011 to win the 10 kilometre San Silvestre Vallecana Silver Label Road Race in Madrid, Spain by overcoming Gelete Burka in a sprint finish.

She won the two-mile race at the New Balance Indoor Grand Prix in Boston on 4 February and took her second career win at the Carlsbad 5000 road race in April.

On 1 June in her first outdoor track race of the year, she won the 10,000 metres at the Prefontaine Classic in Eugene, a Diamond League event, by holding off Florence Kiplagat at the finish line.

Eight days later at the Diamond League Adidas Grand Prix in New York City, Dibaba won the 5000 metres with her last 400 metres being run in 61.54 seconds. Her winning margin over second-place finisher Meseret Defar was more than 6 seconds.

At the 2012 Summer Olympics in London, she successfully defended her 10,000 metres title with a powerful performance over the final 600 metres, winning in a time of 30:20.75. This was the fastest of the year by any female athlete. This made her the first woman to win consecutive Olympic 10,000 meter titles. After the win, she said, "I have never been happier than today – this is even better than in Beijing". In the 5000 metres, she finished third behind gold medalist Meseret Defar and silver medalist Vivian Cheruiyot, thus failing to repeat her 10,000/5000 double from the 2008 Summer Olympics. After the race, Dibaba said, "I'm not very pleased today. I gave it a good shot, but I wasn't aiming for bronze. I'm a bit disappointed."

After the Olympics, she returned to road racing on 16 September at the BUPA Great North Run, a Gold Label Road Race in northern England. She had one of the fastest ever half marathon debuts while winning in a time of 1:07:35. She defeated the marathon gold medalists from the 2012 Summer Olympics and the 2011 World Championships, Tiki Gelana and Edna Kiplagat, respectively, even though both ran personal bests.

Dibaba closed her year on 18 November with a win at the ABN-AMRO Zevenheuvelenloop in Nijmegen, Netherlands, setting the fastest time that season for the 15 kilometre distance.

2013: Third World Championship in the 10,000 metres

In February, Dibaba hoped to break the indoor 2 mile world record at the New Balance Indoor Grand Prix in Boston. Her pacer, however, quit at the 1 kilometre mark, and she finished in 9:13.17, seven seconds off the record. Dibaba said after the race, "With this first race [of the year], I am happy. But I could have run faster with better pacing--9:03 or 9:04. I would have liked to have broken the meet record.... Running alone is a bit tough. When I broke the world record at 5000 meters, I had good pacemakers."

Dibaba had planned to run the London Marathon on 21 April, but an injury to the bottom of her heel forced postponement of her debut at this distance.

She was in good form in May at the Great Manchester Run, setting a course record and an Ethiopian record of 30:49 to win this 10 kilometre road race.

On 1 June, Dibaba won the 5000 metres at the Prefontaine Classic in Eugene, Oregon, U.S., a Diamond League event that doubled as Ethiopia's trials for the World Championships. Her finish time of 14:42.01 was one-half second faster than second-place finisher Mercy Cherono of Kenya. Dibaba also finished ahead of five countrywomen, including London Olympian Belaynesh Oljira.

Dibaba on 27 June ran her last 10,000 metre race before the World Championships at the Golden Spike Ostrava in the Czech Republic. She won with a finishing time of 30:26.67, with Gladys Cherono Kiprono of Kenya finishing second in 30:29.23 and Belaynesh Oljira finishing third.

Just nine days later on 6 July at the Diamond League meeting in Paris, Dibaba clocked the fastest 5000 metres by any woman since 2008: 14:23.68. Ethiopian Almaz Ayana finished second in a personal best of 14:25.84, followed by countrywomen Gelete Burka, Sule Utura, and Buze Diriba.

Dibaba was the favourite to win the 10,000 metres at the World Championships in Moscow. She shadowed the leaders during the race until taking the lead with 500 metres remaining and sprinting to her fifth individual World Championships gold medal. Her finish time was 30:43.45, with her last 400 metres clocked at 59.98 seconds.

Dibaba did not enter the 5000 metres at the World Championships, despite saying in July immediately after her Paris 5000 metres victory that she intended to contest both events. In explaining her decision to skip the race, she denied that she was avoiding longtime rival Meseret Defar, saying, "The [Ethiopian athletics] federation asked us to just run one race each, and that's why I left that race. Both of us have run many times, and they told us that they wanted upcoming athletes to have a chance, and we agreed with that."

On 29 August, Dibaba resumed her rivalry with Defar in the 5000 metres at the Weltklasse Zürich, a Diamond League event. Genzebe Dibaba took the lead after the last pacer dropped out, but she quit the race with 600 metres remaining. Tirunesh then took the lead, with Defar close behind, before Defar passed her in the last 100 metres. Defar finished the race in 14:32.83 with Tirunesh in second at 14:34.82.

Three days later in Tilburg, Netherlands, Dibaba attempted to break Paula Radcliffe's 10 kilometer road race world record of 30:21. Although Dibaba fell short by 9 seconds, her 30:30 finish time was the fourth fastest ever and broke Gladys Cherono Kiprono's 2012 course record by 27 seconds. Dibaba also broke the Ethiopian national record (and her previous personal best) by 19 seconds.

Dibaba's final race of the season was the Great North Run in northern England on 15 September, where she was the defending champion. The race was billed as a "showdown" between Dibaba and Defar. However, the winner of the 2013 London Marathon and silver medalist at the 2012 London Olympics, Priscah Jeptoo from Kenya, won the race in the third fastest time ever for a half marathon (1:05.45). Only Radcliffe and Kenya's Susan Chepkemei had run faster. Defar finished second with a personal best and Dibaba third in a personal best time of 1:06:55.

2014–2015: Marathon debut followed by motherhood

Dibaba made her marathon debut at the 2014 London Marathon. She finished third in a time of 2:20:35, 14 seconds behind winner Edna Kiplagat and 11 seconds behind Florence Kiplagat (unrelated). Dibaba stopped briefly near the 30 kilometre mark to pick up a dropped water bottle.

After becoming pregnant with her first child, Dibaba announced on 5 November that she would skip the 2015 season. Dibaba gave birth to a son in March 2015.

2016: Olympic bronze medalist in historic 10,000 metre race

Dibaba returned to the track in 2016 to qualify for and run in the 10,000 metres at the Summer Olympics in Rio de Janeiro. She did not compete in the 5000 metres at the Olympics for the first time since 2004.

On 29 June, Dibaba lost a 10,000 metres race for the first time in her career. Almaz Ayana won the Ethiopian Olympic Trials in Hengelo, Netherlands with the fastest time (30:07.00) since Meselech Melkamu's 29:53.8 finish time in June 2009, the seventh fastest time ever, and the fastest time ever for a 10,000 metres debut. Gelete Burka finished in second (30:28.47) with Dibaba in third (30:28.53).

In perhaps the greatest 10,000 metres race of all time, Dibaba ran the fourth fastest time in history while winning the bronze medal. Her finish time of 29:42.56 was 12.1 seconds faster than her previous personal best of 29:54.66, which she set at the 2008 Summer Olympics in Beijing. Teammate Almaz Ayana smashed Wang Junxia's 22 year old (and controversial) world record (29:31.78) by 14.33 seconds on her way to the gold medal in a time of 29:17.45. Silver medalist Vivian Cheruiyot of Kenya came within 0.75 seconds of Wang's world record while running the third fastest time (29:32.53) in history. Fourth place finisher Alice Aprot Nawowuna of Kenya ran the fifth fastest time (29:53.51) in history. (She led the race for the first 5000 metres, reaching that mark in a very quick 14:46.81.) The next 9 finishers each set an area record (Molly Huddle of the U.S.), a national record (Cheruiyot of Kenya, Sarah Lahti of Sweden, Diane Nukuri of Burundi), or a personal best. National records for Greece, Kyrgyzstan, and Uzbekistan also were broken. Before this race, a woman had finished a 10,000 metres race in under 30 minutes only five times - but four did so in this race. Dibaba said after the race, "I had a short time after delivery. Fortunately I got bronze.... This is great for me, my family and all of Ethiopia. The bronze is for my son."

2017: 10,000 metres silver medalist at the World Championships

Dibaba again ran the London Marathon, finishing in second place in a time of 2:17:56. This made her the third fastest woman ever in a marathon. Mary Jepkosgei Keitany's winning finish time of 2:17:01 was a world record for a women-only marathon and was the second-fastest performance in history. Only Paula Radcliffe has run faster, 2:15:25 at the mixed-gender 2003 London Marathon.

She won the silver medal in the 10,000 metres at the World Championships in London in August, finishing 46.37 seconds behind Almaz Ayana. Ayana broke open the race at the 4000 metres mark, running her next 1000 metres in 2:49.18. Dibaba had been training for this race for only two months, explaining after the race, “If I had followed ... [Ayana], I wouldn't have won a medal. I know my capacity these days because my training for this race was very short." This was the third consecutive 10,000 metres race that Ayana had defeated Dibaba. Dibaba's 1000 metre splits were as follows:
 1000 metres: 3:31.43 (20th position)
 2000 metres: 3:18.88 (6:50.31) (17th)
 3000 metres: 3:09.37 (9:59.68) (2nd)
 4000 metres: 3:04.66 (13:04.34) (6th)
 5000 metres: 2:56.30 (16:00.64) (6th)
 6000 metres: 2:59.86 (19:00.50) (6th)
 7000 metres: 3:02.10 (22:02.60) (4th)
 8000 metres: 3:05.70 (25:08.30) (5th)
 9000 metres: 3:04.41 (28:12.71) (4th)
 Finish: 2:49.98 (31:02.69) (2nd)
 Last 5000 metres: 15:02.05

Dibaba committed to run the Chicago Marathon on 8 October. She won a gold medal during the 40th edition of the marathon, with a time of 2:18:30.

2018
Dibaba again ran the London Marathon in April, but failed to finish. She won the Great Manchester Run road 10K for the third consecutive time and fifth time overall the following month. She finished third in the Berlin Marathon with a time of 2:18:55 in September. Dibaba placed sixth at the Delhi Half Marathon in October and ran the San Silvestre Vallecana road 10k in Madrid on 31 December. She finished third with a time of 30:40. The run was won by Brigid Kosgei (Kenya) in 29:54, the runner up was Hellen Obiri (Kenya) with 29:59. Due to the downhill nature of the course, times set there are not eligible for world record purposes.

2023
The 37-year-old returned after giving birth to a third child running her first race since December 2018 at the Houston Half Marathon in January. She finished 16th with a time of 71:35.

Personal life
Tirunesh is married to 2004 and 2008 Olympic 10,000 meter silver medallist Sileshi Sihine and they have a son, Nathan Sileshi, born in March 2015. She gave birth to a second child named Allon, at an unspecified date but announced the birth on her Instagram profile in January 2020. She had a third child in 2021.

After the Beijing Olympics, her club, the Prisons Police, bestowed the rank of Chief Superintendent for her services to club and country. Tirunesh has an honorary doctorate from Addis Ababa University, and has a hospital on the outskirts of Addis Ababa named after her.

She has ventured into the hotel industry by establishing an eponymous Three Star hotel, which was set to open at the end of 2013. Local architectural and construction firm Kellog Consult won the bid to design and build the $1.8 million hotel.

Results

Olympics (outdoor)
In these track races at the Olympics, Dibaba's win–loss record against the following women is as follows:

IAAF world championship events

Dibaba has not participated in any edition of the IAAF World Indoor Championships. In other IAAF world championship races, Dibaba's win–loss record against the following women is set forth below. Only event finals are counted. A "did not finish" (DNF) is counted as a loss to everyone who completed the race. A "did not start" is treated as being absent from the race.

African Championships in Athletics (outdoor track)

In these African Championship outdoor track races, Dibaba's win–loss record against the following women is as follows:

All-Africa Games (outdoor track)

In these All-Africa Games outdoor track races, Dibaba's win–loss record against the following women is as follows:

Diamond League, Golden League (outdoor track)
Since 2010, the Diamond League has been an annual series of athletics meetings organised by the IAAF around the world. The Golden League was an annual series of athletics meetings organised by the IAAF in Europe from 1998 through 2009.

In these Golden League and Diamond League races, Dibaba's win–loss record against the following women is as follows:

World Athletics Finals (outdoor track)
World Athletics Final was an annual athletics competition organised by the IAAF from 2003 to 2009. In these races, Dibaba's win–loss record against the following women is as follows:

Grand Prix, World Athletics Challenge (outdoor track)

In these Grand Prix and World Athletics Challenge races, Dibaba's win–loss record against the following women is as follows:

Other outdoor track & cross country races

In these outdoor track and cross country races, Dibaba's win–loss record against the following women is as follows:

Personal bests

Outdoor
As of 29 June 2017, Dibaba's outdoor personal bests are as follows:

Indoor

Notes

References

External links

"Dibaba – A jewel of inestimable value", by Steven Downes, Athletics Africa, 20 March 2005
Tirunesh Dibaba's profile from Global Athletics
Beijing 2008 Women's 10000 m EthioTube Video
Beijing 2008 Women's 5000 m EthioTube Video
"Spend a Day With Tirunesh Dibaba", by Toby Tanser, Runner's World
Video Interview of Tirunesh Dibaba before and after 2007 IAAF World Championships 10,000m

1985 births
Living people
Sportspeople from Oromia Region
Ethiopian female long-distance runners
Ethiopian female marathon runners
Olympic athletes of Ethiopia
Olympic gold medalists for Ethiopia
Olympic bronze medalists for Ethiopia
Athletes (track and field) at the 2004 Summer Olympics
Athletes (track and field) at the 2008 Summer Olympics
Athletes (track and field) at the 2012 Summer Olympics
Athletes (track and field) at the 2016 Summer Olympics
Medalists at the 2004 Summer Olympics
Medalists at the 2008 Summer Olympics
Medalists at the 2012 Summer Olympics
Medalists at the 2016 Summer Olympics
World Athletics Championships athletes for Ethiopia
World Athletics Championships medalists
World Athletics Cross Country Championships winners
Olympic gold medalists in athletics (track and field)
Olympic bronze medalists in athletics (track and field)
IAAF Golden League winners
World Athletics Championships winners
Chicago Marathon female winners
Athletes (track and field) at the 2003 All-Africa Games
African Games competitors for Ethiopia